"Breakdown" is the 12th television play episode of the second season of the Australian anthology television series Australian Playhouse. "Breakdown" was written by Michael Boddy and originally aired on ABC on 9 October 1967.

Plot
The social machine breaks down — first in a late-night suburban train and second in an ancient lift. In both cases the man is faced with impenetrable and frightening problems.

Cast
 Max Meldrum
 George Whaley

References

External links
 
 

1967 television plays
1967 Australian television episodes
1960s Australian television plays
Australian Playhouse (season 2) episodes